Homalonychus is a genus of araneomorph spiders, and is the only genus in the family Homalonychidae. It was first described by George Marx in 1891.  it contains only three species: H. raghavai, H. selenopoides, and H. theologus. Two are found in the southern United States and Mexico: H. theologus is mostly found west of the Colorado River, while H. selenopoides is mostly found to the east, with some populations in Death Valley and near Mercury, Nevada.

They do not build webs, and are typically found under rocks or dead vegetation. At least the two North American species live in deserts, to which they are adapted by color and specialized setae which allow them to attach sand and fine soil to themselves. They also partially bury themselves.

In 1991 a single female was described in India, but it is likely misplaced in this genus.

References

Further reading

External links

Pictures of Homalonychus sp.

Araneomorphae genera
Homalonychidae